The flag of the president of the Philippines or the presidential standard of the Philippines consists of the presidential coat of arms on a blue background. While having the same design as the presidential seal since 1947, the flag has a separate history, and the designs on the flag and seal have at different times influenced each other.

Overview 

The flag is often displayed beside the president in official portraits, flown next to the coffin of a deceased president in state funerals, and flown on the president's motorcade.

It is also customarily used during diplomatic visits in the review of honor guards. A lone honor guard traditionally holds the presidential flag while tailing  the president of the Philippines and the visiting foreign leader.

The current flag is defined in Executive Order 310 signed by former President Gloria Macapagal Arroyo:

The flag and seal designs are similar to that of the flag of the president of the United States.

Historical flags

See also
President of the Philippines
Seal of the President of the Philippines
Flag of the Philippines

References

External links 

 The Presidential Seal
 Official website of the Office of President of the Republic of the Philippines

 Flag
Flags of the Philippines
Flag of the President
Flags displaying animals